A direct agglutination test (DAT) is any test that uses whole organisms as a means of looking for serum antibodies.  The abbreviation, DAT, is most frequently used for the serological test for visceral leishmaniasis.

References

Blood tests